Hazeldean is a rural locality in the Somerset Region, Queensland, Australia.

Geography 
Lake Somerset occupies the east of the locality. Lake Somerset is the reservoir created by the Somerset Dam impounding the Stanley River.

The western part of the locality is elevated and remains mostly vegetated. The strip of land  between the lake and the mountains is mostly rural-residential.

History 

Stanley River Provisional School opened on 26 January 1898 with an initial enrolment of 24 students. On 1 January 1909, it became Stanley River State School. The school was on the eastern side of the Esk Kilcoy Road (approx ). 

In the 1920s, a 300 metre tramway was constructed in Hazeldean to move timber down a steep descent from mountain top to bottom.

As parts of Hazeldean would be flooded following the completion of the Somerset Dam across the Stanley River, in 1951, it was necessary to plan for road re-alignments. As part of this, it was decided to relocate the Stanley River State School to higher ground. A new  was chosen for the new school site further south on the Esk Kilcoy Road and the school buildings including the teacher's residence relocated to the new site. Down to 12 students enrolled, the school closed on 31 December 1973. On 9 July 1975, the Stanley River Field Study Centre opened in the school buildings, becoming the Stanley River Environmental Education Centre in 1990.

Education 
Stanley River Environmental Education Centre is an Outdoor and Environmental Education Centre at 3856 Esk-Kilcoy Road.

There are no mainstream schools in Hazeldean. The nearest government primary school is Kilcoy State School in Kilcoy to the north-east. The nearest government secondary schools are Kilcoy State High School in Kilcoy and Toogoolawah State High School in Toogoolawah to the south-west.

Amenities 
There are two boat ramps into the Lake Somerset Dam off Kirkleigh Road:

 Kirkleigh North.
 Kirkleigh South

Both are managed by the Seqwater.

Attractions 
Lake Somerset Holiday Park is a large park on the edge of Somerset Dam which offers a range of accommodation including cabins and camping.

See also
 List of tramways in Queensland

References

External links

Suburbs of Somerset Region
Localities in Queensland